The Indian locomotive class WDG-4 (EMD GT46MAC) is a freight-hauling diesel-electric locomotive with AC electric transmission designed by General Motors Electro-Motive Diesel in 1997–1998 for Indian Railways, where they are classed as WDG-4. Derived from the EMD SD70MAC, it is powered by a 4,000-horsepower (3,000 kW) 16-cylinder EMD 710 prime mover and it emerged as the Top state-of-the-art high-power diesel locomotive, on its arrival on Indian tracks. Thirteen were built by EMD as order #958647, and a further eight were exported in kit form and assembled in India. The class entered service in 1999.

Further construction has been under license in India by the Banaras Locomotive Works (BLW); more than 60 additional locomotives have been built . They are numbered from #12001 upward. A similar type, the EMD GT46PAC, has also been produced for passenger service in India.

, EMD and DLW have begun building GT46ACe's using IGBT technology to replace the older gate turn-off thyristor technology and along with increase of 500 hp, ie, using the Newly tweaked EMD 16N-710G3B-EC, like the passenger WDP-4B have been produced. Newer versions with widened Piggy-face cab profile for enhanced visibility, just like the later variants of WDP-4's and WDP-4B's were also produced.
 
, DLW began building the Dual Cab version, EMD JT46ACe, called WDG-4D, based on the passenger variant WDP-4D locos, same for both-side visibility. Here again, many features, including IGBT and 4,500 hp have been carried on from the single cab GT46ACe's. The first WDG-4D, numbered 12681, is named "Vijay". Later WDG-4D's were numbered from 70301, as the 12*** series came to an end in 2014 and got switched to 70*** series. Over 1,500 such locomotives, including both WDG-4's and WDG-4D's are currently in operation.

In popular culture
In the 2017 Tamil language action film Theeran Adhigaaram Ondru, a WDG-4 locomotive numbered 12492, from Bhagat Ki Kothi (BGKT) DLS was featured in an action scene, where Karthi, who plays the title role, boards a train to fight criminals.

Locomotive sheds

See also
Indian locomotive class WDP-4
List of diesel locomotives of India
Indian Railways
Rail transport in India

References

External links

Detailed Specifications for the WDG4

 

G-4
Co-Co locomotives
G46TMAC
5 ft 6 in gauge locomotives
Railway locomotives introduced in 1999